Sir Evan Owen Williams (20 March 1890 – 23 May 1969) was an English engineer and architect, known for being the principal engineer for the original Wembley Stadium, and later Gravelly Hill Interchange (known popularly as Spaghetti Junction) as well as a number of key modernist buildings, including the Express Building in Manchester and the D10 and D6 Buildings at the Boots Factory Site in Nottingham.

Career

Williams was born at 16 Caroline Terrace in Tottenham, London, England, on 20 March 1890. He was the son of Evan Owen Williams, a Welsh-born grocer and Mary Roberts. Originally both farmers, they moved to London some years before Owen was born. Williams had two sisters and two brothers. Mary Kate died young, but the second born, Elizabeth Maud, became an author. Owen had an older brother, Robert Osian, who was a successful banker and came out of retirement to manage the finances of his brother's engineering practice which was launched in 1940. Williams attended Tottenham Grammar School and excelled in mathematics. He was apprenticed to the Electrical Tramways Co. in London in 1907 and at the same time did an engineering degree at the University of London.

In 1912, Williams assumed a position as engineer and designer with the Trussed Concrete Company. Seven years later, he started his own consulting firm, Williams Concrete Structures. 
 
He was then appointed chief consulting civil engineer to the British Empire Exhibition which included the old Wembley Stadium. The commission also included the Palace of Industry building in Brent, the first building in the United Kingdom to use concrete as the exterior. 

The building was listed in 1997 in recognition of this but was delisted in 2004 after an appeal by a property developer. Williams was recognised for his achievements and received a knighthood in 1923 or 1924.

Through the exhibition, Williams met its architect, Maxwell Ayrton, and they worked together on the design of Williams's bridges in Scotland.

Williams designed his buildings as functional structures sheathed in decorative facades. More an engineer than an architect, he produced a series of reinforced concrete buildings during the period between the wars. After World War II he worked on developing the first plan for Britain's motorway system. His other works include the Dorchester Hotel, buildings at the Boots Factory Site in Beeston, Nottinghamshire, the M1 motorway and the Pioneer Health Centre in Peckham, south London.

In the 1940s, the company expanded and became Sir Owen Williams and Partners. This followed the building of the Daily Express Building, Manchester, which Williams designed. Contrary to popular belief, the Manchester building was the only one of the three Express Buildings which Williams designed – the others in Glasgow and London were designed by Ellis and Clark. 

Although Williams was more of an engineer than an architect, the Express Building in Manchester was lauded for its architecture and demonstrated his proficiency as an architect. Owen Williams' grandson, Richard Williams, was chief executive of the Owen Williams Group until its acquisition by Amey in 2006.

List of works
(Including bridges)

1913–14 – Resident engineer for Trussed Concrete Steel Company at Patent Fuel Works, Swansea Docks
1914–16 – Chief estimating engineer, Trussed Concrete Steel Company
1916–17 – Assistant aeroplane designer, Wells Aviation
1917–18 – Various ships and slipways, Poole, Dorset
1921–24 – British Empire Exhibition buildings at Wembley Park with Maxwell Ayrton (included Palace of Industry Building which was listed in 1997 and delisted in 2004)
1921–24 – Wembley Stadium with Maxwell Ayrton
1924–25 – Lea Valley Viaduct and Bridge with Maxwell Ayrton
1924–25 – Parc des Attractions, Paris
1924–26 – Findhorn Bridge with Maxwell Ayrton
1924–27 – Road Bridge, Shepherd Leys Wood
1924–29 – Bournemouth Pavilion with Home & Knight
1925–26 – Spey Bridge, Newtonmore ... architect: Maxwell Ayrton
1925–26 – Crubenmore and Loch Alvie Bridges ... architect: Maxwell Ayrton
1925–26 – Duntocher Bridge ... architect: Maxwell Ayrton
1925–26 – Belfast Water Tower, Northern Ireland
1925–26 – Wansford Bridge, Huntingdonshire with Maxwell Ayrton
1926–28 – Dalnamein Bridge with Maxwell Ayrton
1926–28 – Carr Bridge (demolished) with Maxwell Ayrton
1926–28 – Lochy Bridge with Maxwell Ayrton
1927–28 – Brora Bridge
1927-28 – Clapton Stadium
1927–30 – Montrose Bridge
1928–29 – Pont-Rhyd-Owen Bridge
1928–30 – Wadham Road Viaduct
1928–30 – Harnham Bridge, Wiltshire
1928–30 – Pilkington's Warehouse, London
1929–30 – The Dorchester Hotel proposal
1929–31 – Wakefield Bridge
1929–31 – Llechryd Bridge proposal
1929–31 – Daily Express, London as engineer with architects H. O. Ellis & Clarke
1930–32 – Boots Packed Wet Goods Factory (D10 Building)
1931–33 – Sainsburys Factory and warehouse
1932–34 – Cumberland Garage and Car Park
1933–34 – Empire Pool, Wembley Park
1933–35 – Pioneer Health Centre, London
1933–36 – Residential flats, Stanmore
1935–37 – Provincial Newspaper office, London
1935–38 – Odhams Printing Works
1935–38 – Boots Packed Dry Goods Factory (D6 Building)
1935–39 – Daily Express Building, Manchester
1936–37 – Lilley & Skinner office and warehouse extension
1936–38 – Dollis Hill Synagogue
1936–39 – Scottish Daily Express Building, Glasgow
1938–39 – Daily News Garage, London
1939–41 – Vickers-Armstrong Aircraft Factory completed by Oscar Faber & Partners
1944–45 – Wilvan Houses
1944–45 – Mobile home
1945–67 – Newport By-pass (present-day M4)
1950–55 – BOAC Maintenance Headquarters, Heathrow
1951–59 – M1 Motorway phase one (with James Price as chief resident engineer)
1953–66 – Port Talbot By-pass
1954–56 – BOAC Wing Hangars, Heathrow
1955–61 – Daily Mirror Building (now demolished)
1956–67 – M1 Motorway phase two (with James Price as chief resident engineer)

References

1890 births
1969 deaths
People from Tottenham
English civil engineers
Alumni of the University of London
People educated at Tottenham Grammar School